Rush Salt Lake City was an American women's soccer team. The team was a member of the Women's Premier Soccer League, the third tier of women’s soccer in the United States and Canada for just one season, in 2007, after which the team left the league and the franchise was terminated.

Year-by-year

   

Women's Premier Soccer League teams
Women's soccer clubs in the United States
Soccer clubs in Salt Lake City
2007 establishments in Utah
2007 disestablishments in Utah
Association football clubs established in 2007
Association football clubs disestablished in 2007
Women's sports in Utah